Waiting for Spring is an album by American pianist David Benoit released in 1989 and recorded for the GRP label. The album reached No. 1 on the Billboard Jazz Albums chart.

Track listing
All tracks written by David Benoit except as noted.

Personnel 
 David Benoit – grand piano
 Emily Remler – guitar (1-11)
 Robert Benoit – guitar (12)
 Luther Hughes – bass (1, 2, 4, 5, 7-12)
 John Patitucci – bass (3, 6)
 Peter Erskine – drums

Production 
 David Benoit – producer
 Jeffrey Weber – producer
 Dave Grusin – executive producer 
 Larry Rosen – executive producer
 Allen Sides – engineer, mixing 
 Steve Holroyd – assistant engineer 
 Mike Ross – assistant engineer 
 Michael Landy – digital editing at The Review Room (New York City, New York).
 Ted Jensen – mastering at Sterling Sound (New York City, New York).
 Andy Baltimore – creative director, cover photography
 David Gibb – graphic design 
 Andy Ruggirello – graphic design 
 Dan Serrano – graphic design

Charts

References

External links
David Benoit-Waiting For Spring at Discogs
David Benoit-Waiting For Spring at AllMusic

1989 albums
David Benoit (musician) albums
GRP Records albums